Seth Low (January 18, 1850 – September 17, 1916) was an American educator and political figure who served as the mayor of Brooklyn from 1881 to 1885, the president of Columbia University from 1890 to 1901, a diplomatic representative of the United States, and the mayor of New York City from 1902 to 1903. He was a leading municipal reformer fighting for efficiency during the Progressive Era.

Early life

Low was the son of Abiel Abbot Low and Ellen Almira Dow. Low's father was a leading trader in China, and his father's sister, Harriet Low, was one of the first young American women to live in China. The Low family was old Puritan New England stock, descended from Thomas Low of Essex County, Massachusetts. Low was named after his grandfather Seth Low (1782–1853) who moved with his son Abiel to Brooklyn to start a prosperous importing company. When Brooklyn was incorporated as a city in 1834, Seth the elder was one of the incorporators; he also served on the Board of Aldermen and was first President of the Board of Education. Seth the elder was also involved with charity and support work for the poor; on his deathbed, he admonished his three-year-old grandson and namesake: "Be kind to the poor."

Low's father was a Unitarian, and his mother was an Episcopalian. For years, Low wavered between the two faiths. Finally, at age 22, Low decided he would henceforth be an Episcopalian.

Low attended Poly Prep Country Day School in Brooklyn and Columbia College. After graduating from Columbia in 1870, Low made a short trip abroad, and then entered the tea and silk house of A. A. Low & Brothers, which had been founded by his father in New York. In 1875, he was admitted a member of the firm, from which, upon its liquidation in 1888, he withdrew with a large fortune.

In the mid-1870s, Seth Low began to lay the groundwork for his political career by supporting "welfare reform" and the elimination of food and coal disbursements for the poor which caused "starving people" to gather at "warehouses where food was stored" to beg for help.  During this period, the reform movement, of which Low was a stalwart, denounced emergency assistance of potatoes and flour for the poor.  The reduction in welfare assistance for the poor led many to seek shelter in "police station basements" and in city hospitals, and led many poor parents to bring "their children to asylums" and many men to beg on the streets for "charity or work."

On 1880-12-09, he married Anne Wroe Scollay Curtis of Boston, daughter of Justice Benjamin R. Curtis of the United States Supreme Court. They had no biological children, but adopted two nieces and a nephew.

Mayor of Brooklyn

First term
By 1881 Brooklyn had been governed for years by a corrupt Democratic political machine under Hugh McLaughlin. By this time, a wave of goo-goo (or "good government") sentiment had begun to gain favor, and public sentiment was starting to turn against the incumbent Democratic regime.

Brooklyn Republicans sensed an opportunity, but they were split between the "stalwart" candidate Benjamin F. Tracy and reform candidate Ripley Ropes. Low had no particular ambition to become Mayor, but his name was brought forth as a compromise, because his wealth and old family name appealed to the "stalwarts" and his reformist views appealed to the reformers. Low accepted the nomination at the Republican city convention, making it clear that he would not be a partisan mayor. Low defeated the incumbent Democrat James Howell after a two-week campaign, 45,434 votes to 40,937.

Low's time in office was marked by a number of reforms:

 Low's major achievement as mayor was to secure a degree of "home rule" of the city. Previously, the State Government dictated city policies, hiring, salaries, and other affairs. Low managed to secure an unofficial veto over all Brooklyn bills in the State Assembly.
 Low instituted a number of educational reforms. He was the first to integrate Brooklyn schools. He introduced free textbooks for all students, not just those who had taken a pauper's oath. He instituted a competitive examination for hiring teachers, instead of giving teaching jobs to pay political debts. Low set aside $430,000 for the construction of new schools to accommodate 10,000 new students.
 Low introduced Civil Service Code to all city employees, eliminating patronage jobs.
 German immigrants wanted to enjoy their local beer gardens on the Sabbath, in violation of state "dry" laws and the demands of local puritanical clergy. Low's compromise solution was that saloons could stay open as long as they were orderly. At the first sign of rowdiness, they would be closed.
 Low served as a member of the board of the New York Bridge Company, the company that built the Brooklyn Bridge, and led an unsuccessful effort to remove Washington Roebling as the chief engineer on that project.

 Low raised the tax rate from $2.33 of $100 assessed valuation in 1881 to $2.59 in 1883. He also went after property owners who had not paid back taxes. This increase in city revenue enabled him to reduce the city's debt and increase services. However, raising taxes proved extremely unpopular.

Second term
Low's tax increases and non-partisan governing policy lost him a measure of public support. By 1883, fellow Republicans were criticizing Low openly, and the press was critical of his tax policy. Although the Democrats ran the weak, nearly unknown candidate Joseph C. Hendrix in 1883, Low beat him by a slimmer margin than his first election. Where Low won his first term by 5,000 votes, he squeaked by re-election with only a 1,548-vote margin.

In 1884, Low's mugwump support of Democrat Grover Cleveland in 1884 furthered the rift with his fellow Republicans. He declined to run for a third term in 1885, and refused to support Republican nominee General Isaac S. Catlin. Instead, he supported a reform candidate, General John R. Woodward. By this time, the public was losing their attraction to reform, and Democrat Daniel D. Whitney won election. With Whitney came the return of Democratic machine politics for another seven years. By 1892, some writers were looking back on Low's tenure as a "Golden Age" of clean government.

President of Columbia University

Following his tenure as mayor of Brooklyn, Low assumed the presidency of Columbia College, serving between 1890 and 1901. Not an educator in the specific meaning of the word, he succeeded by his administrative skill in transforming the institution. He led the move of the institution from Midtown Manhattan to Morningside Heights, and secured trustee approval to change its name to "Columbia University". The new campus matched Low's vision of a civic university fully integrated into the city; the original design subsequently reconceived, left it open to the street and surrounding neighborhoods.

To forge a university, Low vitally united the various schools into one organization whose direction was moved from the separate faculties to a university council. Further reforms effected by him include the reorganization of the Law School, the addition of a faculty of pure science, the association of the University with the Teachers College, and the extension of the department of political and social study. In 1895, he gave one million dollars of his inheritance from his father for Low Memorial Library to be built at the new Columbia University campus. It was dedicated to his father and opened in 1897.

International Peace Conference

On July 4, 1899, he was one of the American delegates to attend the International Peace Conference at The Hague. Others in the delegation were Andrew D. White, then the United States Ambassador to the German Empire; Stanford Newel of Minnesota, then the United States Minister to the Netherlands; Captain Alfred Mahan, of the United States Navy; Captain William Crozier, of the United States Army; and Frederick Holls of New York.

At the conference, Low made the concluding speech, printed two months later in The New York Times, saying:

Mayor of New York City

Low's first campaign for mayor of consolidated New York in 1897 was unsuccessful, partially because of a division among anti-Tammany Hall candidates and parties. However, four years later, he managed to attain office.

During his 1901 campaign, he had the support of humorist Mark Twain. He and Twain made a joint appearance that drew a crowd of more than 2,000.

In 1902, Low resigned as president of the university to become the second mayor of the newly consolidated City of New York. He stands out as the first mayor of Greater New York to be elected on a fusion ticket, with the support of both the Citizens Union and Republican parties. Some of his notable achievements include the introduction of a civil service system — based upon merit — for hiring municipal employees, reducing widespread graft within the police department, improving the system of education within the city, and lowering taxes. Despite these seemingly impressive achievements he only served for two years and was defeated in 1903 by Democrat George B. McClellan Jr.

Later life

He was chairman of the Tuskegee University (formerly Tuskegee Institute), a historically black college directed under Booker T. Washington, from 1907 until 1916. From 1907, he was also president of the business-labor alliance the National Civic Federation. Even though he believed in collective bargaining rights, which had customarily been denied to labor unions by those in authority, he did not favor strikes, but rather embraced arbitration as a suitable labor-management negotiation tactic.
He was a founder and the first president of the Bureau of Charities of Brooklyn, and was elected vice-president of the New York Academy of Sciences and president of the Archaeological Institute of America.

Low became interested in the food supply problem, that is its contribution to the constantly increasing cost of living. He became convinced that this difficulty could best be solved by democratic cooperation among farmers and consumers. He was president of the Bedford Farmers' Cooperative Association. He was also one of the founders of the Cooperative Wholesale Corporation of New York City, an organization which seeks to bring about a business federation of all the consumers' cooperative store societies in the eastern United States, but not being in sympathy with the radical tendency of this phase of the cooperative movement, he finally resigned and devoted himself entirely to the agricultural phase of cooperation. Low was also a trustee of the Carnegie Institute of Washington, D.C.

In the Spring of 1916, Low became ill with cancer. He died in his home in Bedford Hills, New York, on 1916-09-17. Even his funeral demonstrated the ability of Low to reach political consensus, with honorary pallbearers that included both financier and philanthropist J. P. Morgan Jr. and labor activist and AFL founder Samuel Gompers. 

He is buried in Green-Wood Cemetery in Brooklyn, New York.

The Brooklyn Fire Department operated a fireboat named Seth Low from 1885 to 1917.

In the Bensonhurst neighborhood of Brooklyn there is also a playground named after Low.

In Seth Low Pierrepont State Park Reserve, named after Low's nephew, there is a street named after Low called Seth Low Mountain Road.
Intermediate School 96 in Bensonhurst, Brooklyn is known as Seth Low Intermediate School 96.

In the Brownsville section of Brooklyn, New York, there is a NYCHA public housing development named Seth Low Houses. It consists of four 17 and 18 story buildings.

There was a Seth Low Junior College at Columbia University between 1928 and 1936.

See also
List of mayors of New York City

References
Notes

Further reading

External links

 
 
 Finding aid to Seth Low papers at Columbia University. Rare Book & Manuscript Library.

1850 births
1916 deaths
19th-century American politicians
20th-century American politicians
American Geographical Society
Burials at Green-Wood Cemetery
Columbia College (New York) alumni
Deaths from cancer in New York (state)
Delegates to the Hague Peace Conferences
Mayors of Brooklyn
Mayors of New York City
New York (state) Republicans
People from Bedford Hills, New York
Politicians from Westchester County, New York
Poly Prep alumni
Presidents of Columbia University
Progressive Era in the United States
Presidents of the Archaeological Institute of America